Kratochviliella is a monotypic genus of  dwarf spiders containing the single species, Kratochviliella bicapitata. It was first described by F. Miller in 1938, and has only been found in Bulgaria, France, Greece, and Macedonia.

See also
 List of Linyphiidae species (I–P)

References

Linyphiidae
Monotypic Araneomorphae genera